Dobbelaere is a Flemish surname. Notable people with the surname include:

 Ethan Dobbelaere (born 2002), American professional soccer player
 Julien Dobbelaere (born 1921), Belgian wrestler
 Karel Dobbelaere (born 1933), Belgian educator and sociologist

See also
 Dobler (surname)